Saint Publius is a first century Maltese bishop. He is venerated as the first Bishop of Malta and one of the first Bishops of Athens. 

Publius is Malta's first acknowledged saint, the prince of the island. According to Maltese Christian tradition, Publius' conversion led to Malta being the first Christian nation in the West. His feast day is celebrated by the Roman Catholic Church and the Orthodox Church, of which the traditions related and the day of celebration differ.

History and tradition
According to Christian tradition, it was Publius who received Paul the Apostle during his shipwreck on the island as recounted in the Acts of the Apostles. According to the Acts of the Apostles, Paul cured Publius' dysentery-afflicted father.

"In the vicinity of that place were lands belonging to a man named Publius, the chief of the island. He welcomed us and received us cordially as his guests for three days. It so happened that the father of Publius was sick with a fever and dysentery. Paul visited him and, after praying, laid his hands on him and healed him. After this had taken place, the rest of the sick on the island came to Paul and were cured. They paid us great honor and when we eventually set sail they brought us the provisions we needed." — Acts 28:7–10, New American Bible

Apart from being patron saint of Floriana, Publius is also one of the two patron saints of Malta beside Paul. He was martyred c. 125, during the persecution of Emperor Hadrian, and canonised in the year 1634.

His feast is celebrated on January 22, in the Roman Catholic Church, which places him as the successor of Dionysius the Areopagite (Denis the Areopagite), dating his martyrdom to c. 112 AD.

In the Eastern Orthodox Church, however, his feast day is observed on March 13, and according to an epistle of Saint Dionysius, Bishop of Corinth, he is placed as the successor of Saint Narcissus of Athens, dating his martyrdom to the period of the persecution under Marcus Aurelius.

Godfrey Wettinger, a contemporary historian, argues that there is no proof that Paul ever was in Malta other than in pseudo-Maltese history dating from the 11th to the 18th centuries. The island was conquered by the Muslims between 870 and 1091, during which period it also spent years uninhabited, suggesting that Christianity in Malta is not rooted on Publius and Paul. Though the Acts of the Apostles (c. 28) does specifically mention Malta in connection with Paul's voyage and shipwreck, the text does only claims that Publius' father was healed of dysentery and not that he ever converted.

See also
 List of archbishops of Athens
 Archdiocese of Malta
 Malta
 Floriana

Notes

References

112 deaths
2nd-century Christian saints
Maltese saints
People in Acts of the Apostles
National symbols of Malta
Saints of Roman Athens
Year of birth unknown
Bishops of Athens
Bishops of Malta